Faiz Ullah Kamoka (born 6 July 1970) is a Pakistani politician who was a member of the National Assembly of Pakistan from August 2018 to January 2022. On 5 December 2019 he was elected as Chairman Standing Committee on Finance, Revenue and Economic Affairs after the resignation of Asad Umar.

Early life and education
He was born on 6 July 1970 in Faisalabad, Pakistan.

He received the degree of Bachelor of Commerce from Hailey College of Commerce and the degree of Master of Business Administration in Finance from Punjab College of Business Administration in 1999.

Political career
He was elected to the Provincial Assembly of the Punjab as a candidate of Pakistan Peoples Party (PPP) from Constituency PP-68 (Faisalabad-XVIII) in 2002 Pakistani general election. He received 19,417 votes and defeated Mian Zulfiqar Inayat, a candidate of Pakistan Muslim League (N) (PML-N).

He was elected to the National Assembly of Pakistan as a candidate of Pakistan Tehreek-e-Insaf (PTI) from Constituency NA-109 (Faisalabad-IX) in 2018 Pakistani general election.

On 5 December 2019 he was elected as Chairman Standing Committee on Finance, Revenue and Economic Affairs after the resignation of Asad Umar.

He resigned from the National Assembly in January 2023. His rsignation was accepted by Speaker National Assembly Raja Pervaiz Ashraf from 10 April 2022.

References

External Link

More Reading
 List of members of the 15th National Assembly of Pakistan

Living people
Punjab MPAs 2002–2007
Pakistani MNAs 2018–2023
Pakistan People's Party MPAs (Punjab)
Pakistan Tehreek-e-Insaf MNAs
1975 births